Browne Lake is a reservoir in Daggett County, Utah, United States.

Browne Lake was named for J. Allen Browne, a Utah state wildlife official.

References

Reservoirs in Utah
Lakes of Daggett County, Utah
Features of the Uinta Mountains